A  is any one of several traditional Japanese hats.

Grammar and etymology

 shares its etymology with the Japanese word for "umbrella" (also pronounced , but written as ).

Types of 

A number of different styles of  exist.

Some types of  include:

 : a wickerwork  made of shaven bamboo or wood.
 : a wickerwork . An  is a straw hat of the type traditionally worn in some Japanese folk dances.
 : a deep wickerwork .
The samurai class in feudal Japan, as well as their retainers and footsoldiers, used several types of  made from iron, copper, wood, paper, bamboo, or leather.  almost always had crests on them.
 : a bamboo  for traveling with a wide, flat shape that offered protection from the sun and rain.
 : a wickerwork  made of sedge.
 : a Buddhist mendicant's . Unlike an Asian conical hat, it does not come to a point, nor does it ride high on the head like a samurai's traveling hat, instead covering the upper half to two-thirds of the face, masking the identity of the monk and allowing him to travel undistracted on his journey.
 : (see )
 : a folded , famously worn for the Awa Dance Festival.

Gallery

See also 
  ("Yataro's Travel Hat"), a 1957 film by Kazuo Mori
 Salakot
 Asian conical hat

References

External links

Haiku Topics (01)  ..... (WKD - TOPICS): Hat (kasa) at Haiku Topics 

Hats
Japanese headgear
Headgear
Samurai weapons and equipment
Japanese words and phrases